This is a list of  featured in the manga and anime series Bleach, created by Tite Kubo. Soul Reapers are a fictional race of spirits who govern the flow of souls between the human world and the afterlife realm called the Soul Society.

The series tells of how Ichigo Kurosaki becomes a substitute Soul Reaper in Karakura Town in place of Rukia Kuchiki. He assumes her duties to protect souls and put them to peaceful rest, as well as to fight against dangerous, lost souls that could not rest, called hollows.

As the series progresses, however, Rukia is captured by the Soul Society's Soul Reaper military for giving her powers to Ichigo, and she is sentenced to death. Ichigo and his friends go to save her and are forced to fight against many of the Soul Society's Thirteen Court Guard Squads. Eventually, the fifth Squad Captain Sōsuke Aizen, the third Squad Captain Gin Ichimaru, and the ninth Squad Captain Kaname Tosen all defect from the Soul Society at the time of the rescue and start a plan, interrupting Ichigo's battles, to gain greater power with the arrancars, focusing the story with the main antagonist Sōsuke Aizen. In the final arc, the real one is Yhwach, the son of Soul King and father of Quincy.

Creation and conception
Bleach was first conceived from Tite Kubo's desire to draw Shinigami ("Soul Reaper" in the English adaptations) in a kimono, which formed the basis for the design of the Soul Reapers. Before deciding the use of kimono, Kubo thought of giving black suits to male Soul Reapers and any forms to female Soul Reapers, but thought that it was too generic and changed it to a kimono. Several characteristics from them, such as the kidō spells and the zanpakutō swords are also based on Japanese literature. Instead of using zanpakutō, Kubo wanted to give the Soul Reapers guns, with the exception of Rukia, who would use a scythe. Seeing that guns are not suitable for kimono, he changed them to swords. When asked which of the Court Guard Squad captains and assistant captains were his favorites, Tite Kubo answered by saying that he liked "all of them" and that he likes to "support" characters "disliked by readers." Early plans for the story did not include the hierarchical structure of the Soul Society, but did include Ichigo's Soul Reaper heritage.

Characteristics
Soul Reapers can only be seen by other spiritually aware beings, which excludes most humans. Additionally, they can be injured and die like regular humans yet can resist most injuries unless considerably great.

A zanpakutō has a symbiotic connection with its owner, its spiritual embodiment possessing similar traits to its owner and evolving to reflect its Soul Reaper's power. By learning the name of the sword's spirit, and through training, Soul Reapers can unlock more powerful transformations of their zanpakutō. Once achieved, the Soul Reaper can unlock the full potential of their zanpakutō, increasing their own power several times over. Though rare, it is possible for two people to manifest the same zanpakutō and spirit. This is considered the ultimate taboo of the Thirteen Court Guard Squads and the individuals who manifest the spirit are forced to fight to the death to determine the zanpakutōs true master, as in the plot of Bleach: The Diamond Dust Rebellion. Many Soul Reapers manage to use , a form of magic that can be performed by reciting a specific incantation. Most of the kidō spells seen in the series are used as attacks, defensive measures, or to bind others, though they can also serve more specialized needs such as healing wounds or communication over long distances. Spells are ranked on a scale from 1 to 99, indicating their complexity and overall power. Low-level spells can, however, be as effective from a skilled kidō user (e.g., Byakuya Kuchiki).

Soul Reaper operations are based out of the Soul Society, which is an afterlife realm in Bleach which is maintained by a being known as the Soul King. Travel between the human world and the Soul Society is extremely limited and monitored, but some Soul Reapers are stationed in the human world to carry out their duties. If this Soul Reaper is an assistant captain or a captain then they will have a Gentei Reiin, or a Spirit Restriction Seal, on some area of their body. This seal will limit their spiritual powers to one-fifth of their full power and it can only be released in a state of emergency. In addition to these laws, it is a crime for a Soul Reaper to remain in the human world for longer than directed. High-level Soul Reapers and similarly powerful beings are able to levitate by standing on the spiritual energy in the air. The No Breathes From Hell one shot explains that Soul Reaper captains are given a last rites ritual as their Reishi is transferred to another realm due to being too dense to properly diffuse in the Soul Society, the ritual itself revealed to send the deceased Soul Reaper captains to Hell rather than ease their passing.

Soul Reaper court divisions

The  is the central organization in the Soul Society that most Soul Reapers join. It is split into thirteen squads, each symbolized by a flower whose floriography shows the squad's hue.
 - The division's flower is the chrysanthemum - meaning "immaculate".
The division's flower is the Pulsatilla cernua - meaning "splendor".
 - The squad's flower is the Calendula officinalis - meaning "tranquility".
 - Squad Four is known for its medical work. The division's flower is the Gentiana scabra - meaning "fidelity" and "conscience".　
 - The division's flower is the Pieris japonica - meaning "sacrifice".
 - Squad Six has no special duties, but is currently seen as a model division by the other Soul Reapers and known for its strict adherence to the rules. The division's flower is the red Camellia japonica - meaning "righteous reason".
 - The division's flower is the Japanese iris - meaning "kindness" and "vitality".
 - The division's flower is the Strelitzia - meaning "getting everything I(one) want". 
  - Squad Nine is always on standby as it is the security force of the Gotei 13, also overseeing art and culture. The division's flower is the white Papaver somniferum - meaning "oblivion".
  - The division's flower is the Narcissus - meaning "selfishness".
  - Known as the Zaraki Corps, Squad Eleven is well known for its brute military force with a specialization of sword-only combat, making them at loggerheads with the Fourth division. The division's flower is the Chinese yarrow - meaning "battle".
  - a scientific research division and has been the home of the Soul Reaper Research and Development Institute for 110 years. It was directly linked to the S.R.D.I. by former Captain Kisuke Urahara. The division's flower is the Thistle - meaning "revenge", "rigorous" and "independence".
  - division's flower is the Galanthus nivalis - meaning "hope".
The thirteen squad is believed to be inspired greatly from a real swordsman group in Japan, Shinsengumi. There are captains and the squad that refer to the prime Shinsengumi.

Other military forces exist apart from the Gotei Thirteen and serve more specialized capacities:

 The  is a reclusive group that specializes in kidō and is in charge of the gateway connecting the Soul Society and the human world.

The  are the leaders of the thirteen squads. All captains are able to perform the bankai of their zanpakutō. To achieve the position of captain, a Soul Reaper must display great expertise with Soul Reaper abilities and battle tactics, and must be approved by either their fellow captains or the members of their own squad. There are three ways a Soul Reaper can become a captain. 
 To take the captain proficiency test, which requires the ability to perform bankai. Presumably, most Soul Reapers become captains using this method. At least three existing captains, including Head Captain, have to witness the test.
 To have personal recommendations from at least six captains and approval from at least three of the remaining seven.
 To defeat a captain one-on-one with at least 200 witnesses from the captain's division. Kenpachi Zaraki and Kenpachi Kiganjō are the only two known captains to have achieved their rank using this method.

The  are the adjutants to the captains in each squad. In terms of rank, they hold the second seat in the squad. In the case of a squad captain's death, departure, or other circumstances making them unable to perform their duties, the lieutenant acts as the acting captain until another captain can be assigned. The  hold ranks from third seat to twentieth. While single digit ranks are usually assigned to a single officer, the lower ranks are often held by several. Higher ranks may also lead secondary teams within the division; for instance, Hanatarō Yamada is Squad Four's seventh seat and leader of the Fourteenth Advanced Relief Team therein.

Soul Reaper characters by squads

Squad One

Genryūsai Shigekuni Yamamoto

 was the captain of Squad 1 and Head Captain of the Gotei 13, believing that laws must be upheld for the benefit of the community and despised those who break them, though he made an exception with Ichigo due to debt that the entire Soul Society owed to him. He founded the Soul Reaper Academy about 1,000 years before the main Bleach storyline, where he personally instructed Shunsui Kyōraku and Jūshirō Ukitake whom he treated as if they were his sons. Yamamoto claimed that no Soul Reaper born in the last one thousand years is stronger than he is. He is killed by Yhwach.

It is the most powerful zanpakutō in Soul Society, and the sheer power of the flame can disintegrate almost anything the sword is waved at. Its release command is "Reduce All Creation to Ash" (万象一切灰燼と為せ, Banshō issai kaijin to nase or "All things in the universe, Turn to ashes" in the English Dub). Zanka no Tachi's heat reaches temperatures of 15,000,000 degrees, creating flame-like reiatsu around Yamamoto, which renders him untouchable. Merely activating it drains all the moisture in Soul Society. Even squad ten current captain, Toshiro Hitsugaya, cannot release his sword due to the heat radiated from Yamamoto's bankai. Its power is so great it can destroy the entire Soul Society and Yamamoto himself should it remain active for too long.

Yamamoto is voiced by Masaaki Tsukada for the anime series and Binbin Takaoka for "Thousand Year Blood War" in the Japanese version of the anime. In the English dub, he is voiced by Neil Kaplan.

Chōjirō Sasakibe
, was Yamamoto's lieutenant, often present during meetings between the captains. He was the only Soul Reaper that participated in the battle for Karakura Town that did not fight, guarding the fake town with a large barrier. In an omake, it shows that due to a mission in the real world he enjoyed growing tea leaves and making his own tea. He, alongside 106 other Soul Reapers, was killed during the Wandenreich's first invasion of Soul Society. It is revealed during his funeral that he had achieved his bankai even before Yamamoto's pupils, Shunsui Kyōraku and Jūshirō Ukitake did, though due to his loyalty to Yamamoto had never used it or even offered to be a captain. Yamamoto confronted Chōjirō's murderer, the Stern Ritter Driscoll Berci, who tried to kill him using Chōjirō's bankai, only to be obliterated by the enraged Yamamoto for using his lieutenant's bankai so shamefully.

When released with the command , it transforms into a rapier. Its shikai special abilities remain unknown. These pillars can be controlled at will to shock the opponent.

Sasakibe is voiced by Taro Yamaguchi in the Japanese version of the anime. In the English dub, he is voiced by Michael McConnohie when he first speaks in Episode 54 and by Dan Woren in later appearances.

Shunsui Kyōraku
 was originally Squad Eight's captain for most of the storyline. One of the oldest captains alongside his friend Jūshirō Ukitake, Shunsui was trained under Head Captain Yamamoto whom he called . Shunsui is a laid-back and flamboyant man as seen in his attire, wearing a straw hat and a pink flowered haori over his captain's uniform. In his off time, he can be seen drinking sake and napping. Other times, he likes to chase after women, particularly his lieutenant Nanao Ise. Shunsui tends to use a more familiar speech style than most other characters in Bleach; he generally refers to his fellow captains and Soul Reapers by their first name, usually followed by an honorific. Kyōraku is a peace-loving man who will always try to find a nonviolent solution, though he does not wish to insult opponents by refusing to fight. But he is also an adept fighter, able to defeat Coyote Starrk by using only his shikai. After Yamamoto's death, Shunsui becomes the new Head Captain, and chooses Genshirō Okikiba and his niece Nanao as Squad One lieutenants.

Unlike other Soul Reapers, Shunsui possesses paired zanpakutō called . While the blades are normally two daisho swords, their Shikai state resemble dao or falchions. When released with the command , Katen Kyōkotsu gains the ability to "turn children's games into reality." One such game, involves spinning around wind like a top. Another, declares that whoever is the highest is the winner. A third technique, forces the players to alter their own shadows; whoever steps on a shadow, even their own, is declared the loser. The fourth game is known as  where players call out color and then slice the enemy where that color is displayed. However, if the color is not on the body of the person who called it out then the damage given is minimal; the more that the declared color is prevalent on the declarer's body, the more damage the attack will commit. A fifth game is called , a game similar to "Red Light Green Light". The sixth and final game is called  which is a game where if a person is staring hard enough at another person's shadow, then their opponent creates after images of themselves. Katen Kyōkotsu's bankai is called , which he uses only when his allies are at a safe distance from himself. When released, Shunsui's bankai covers a large area around Shunsui in an aura. This aura changes others' perception of the surrounding environment, making them perceive it as darkened, bleak and gloomy, and causes others to feel varying levels of melancholy and despair. While it maintains its shikai form, its bankai allows Shunsui to manifest various stories, which can kill an opponent easily. It also manifests the spirit of Shunsui's zanpakutō, a Feudal-Japan-style mistress referred to as Katen who created a kunoichi offshoot named Kyōkotsu to hold Shinken Hakkyōken until Nanao eventually asks for it.

Shunsui is voiced by Akio Otsuka in the Japanese version of the anime and by Steve Kramer in the English dub.

Nanao Ise
 was originally Squad Eight's lieutenant for most of the series, serving under her uncle, Shunsui Kyōraku. Nanao's family is mostly composed of women with a both a lineage of Shinto priesthood and another reputation in the fact that men who marry into the family, like Shunsui's brother, eventually die due to a family curse. As a child, living with elderly relatives after her mother was executed for discarding Shinken Hakkyōken in the aftermath of her father's death, Nanao joined the Thirteen Court Squads for her knowledge in kidō. During her first days as a member of Squad 8, enjoying being read to by former Squad 8 lieutenant Lisa Yadōmaru, Nanao realized her family's zanpakutō was with Shunsui. Nanao is a very serious and pragmatic person like Lisa, which is at odds with Shunsui's silly antics. Despite this, she is extremely respectful of her captain and follows his instructions without hesitation. Nanao is often accosted by her captain, whose teasing takes various forms. When she is particularly annoyed she removes her glasses. Though her face has never been shown while doing so, this act is apparently quite frightening as most characters who see it are reduced to gibbering wrecks just by witnessing it. When Shunsui becomes the new Head Captain, Nanao becomes his lieutenant in Squad 1 alongside Genshirō Okikiba. While she creates a special kidō capable of blocking the Wandenreich during their second invasion of Soul Society, Nanao later convinces Shunsui to give her Shinken Hakkyōken.

Unlike other Soul Reapers, members of the Ise clan lack zanpakutō and only the family head can inherit Shinken Hakkyōken. Nanao is rarely seen with the weapon for most of the story until Shunsui's battle with Lille Barro, her superior having sealed the zanpakutō into Kyōkotsu to honor his sister-in-law's wish to hide the apparent source of the Ise clan's curse from Nanao in hopes it would end with her generation. But as a last resort, as Shinken Hakkyōken is able to harm divine beings, Shunsui gives the bandaged zanpakutō to Nanao while she accepts the consequences despite being skeptical of it. In its Shikai state, Shinken Hakkyōken takes the form of an ornate medium-sized bladeless sword with a flat end with ability to take the power of a god into itself and disperse it off into the eight directions. The weapon did appear in the art book "All Colour but the Black" in its basic unwrapped form, appearing as either a wakizashi or a tantō.

Nanao is voiced by Hitomi Nabatame in the Japanese version of the anime and by Kate Higgins in the English dub.

Genshirō Okikiba
 was originally 3rd Seat in Squad One, ordered by Yamamoto to guard their barracks during the Wandenreich's attack on the Soul Society. After Yamamoto's death, Okikiba is selected by Shunsui Kyōraku to be his lieutenant along with Nanao Ise.

Shin'etsu Kisaragi 
 was a member of Squad One and father of Shūsuke Amagai introduced in the anime. When Central 46 denied Yamamoto's request to investigate the Kasumiōji Clan Compound upon the clan's manufacturing of the Bakkōtō, Kisaragi is sent to infiltrate the Kasumiōji Clan Compound where he was caught by Gyōkaku Kumoi's men as Gyōkaku Kumoi forces a Bakkōtō on him. Using the control of the Bakkōtō, Kumoi forced Shin'etsu to return to the person who sent him. Shin'etsu ends up fighting Yamamoto, who is forced to kill his subordinate in self-defense. Shūsuke finds his dying body and hears his father's last words "Beware the Bakkōtō".

He is voiced by Hōchu Otsuka in the Japanese version of the anime and by Joe Ochman in the English dub.

Squad Two
After Yoruichi is forced to leave her post for aiding in Kisuke's escape when he was accused of the Hollowification of the Vizards, Suì-Fēng became the current captain of Squad Two.

Marenoshin Ōmaeda
 is the former lieutenant of Squad 2 under Yoruichi as well as former Captain of the Special Forces Patrol Corps, appearing in the Turn Back the Pendulum gaiden. He is the father of the division's current lieutenant, Marechiyo. His appearance is similar to that of his son. Like his son, Marenoshin likes to downgrade the poorer members of the Gotei 13, like Izuru Kira and Shūhei Hisagi. Marenoshin eventually retired his positions, both of which were taken by his son.

Suì-Fēng

, born , is the captain of Squad 2 and also the current Commander in Chief of the Stealth Force. She is a hard worker who believes strongly in following orders. She is also outwardly antagonistic to her underlings as she believes this keeps them on their toes. During her childhood, she served as a bodyguard and eventual protégé of Yoruichi Shihōin with whom she developed a close relationship. When Yoruichi left the Soul Society, Suì-Fēng was crushed by the fact that Yoruichi did not take her with her. When Yoruichi returns to Soul Society a century later, Suì-Fēng engages her in battle yet did not manage to defeat her. After asking the question of why she was left behind, to which Yoruichi's answer is not heard, the two make amends. Their relationship has become somewhat of a running gag: Suì-Fēng likes anything resembling a black cat (a form Yoruichi can assume at will) and displays jealousy should Yoruichi be in someone else's company. Suì-Fēng also applies battle techniques similar to Yoruichi, engaging the enemies by using hand-to-hand combat with Shunpo abilities.

When released by the command , it shrinks into a stinger that is worn on the middle finger of Suì-Fēng's right hand. Whenever it stabs an opponent, a butterfly-like symbol called a  spreads from the point of contact. The crest bears four wings because the Hornet has two sets of full-size wings located on its thorax. Due to her training, this mark can be kept there for as long as she desires. Should Suzumebachi stab the same location again, the opponent dies. This technique is called "Nigeki Kessatsu (弐撃決殺, Death in Two Steps)". This also holds true if an internal organ is pierced in the same location, regardless of the point of entry into the body. Furthermore, if Suì-Fēng is infected with a foreign poison, she can stab herself with her zanpakutō to counteract the new poison with her own, neutralizing it. Suzumebachi's Bankai,  is a part shaped like a bee's stomach acting as a homing missile high in power with a part acting as a launcher with a sighting device, shaped like a mask. Suì-Fēng notes that normally she can only use her bankai once every three days without issue; using it more than once in a day, while possible, drains considerable amounts of her spirit energy. So even the second shot would exhaust her to the point where her speed and maneuverability would be seriously impaired which is anathema to her fighting style which requires high levels of both. Even without the weapon, Suì-Fēng reformed the secret art Shunko(瞬開), meaning she is strong in close combat.

In the Japanese version of the anime, Suì-Fēng was originally voiced by Tomoko Kawakami in early episodes and by Houko Kuwashima for the rest of the series. In the English dub, she is voiced by Karen Strassman.

Marechiyo Ōmaeda
 is the lieutenant of Squad Two Division and Captain of the Special Forces Patrol Corps. He comes across as arrogant and dull. In an omake, he is shown to come from a rich family, where he is revealed to have a ridiculously long name: . Other characters suspect that he received his position as a lieutenant because of his family's influence. Despite his dense and foolish attitude, he is a skilled tactician, is not above putting himself in danger for his duty, and only feigns weakness and stupidity to lull his opponents into underestimating him, using this to aid in his near victory over one of Aizen's arrancar.

It transforms into an oversized flail that can be thrown to inflict great physical damage to foes. He has not obtained his Bankai yet.

He is voiced by Shōto Kashii in the Japanese version of the anime and by Lex Lang in the English version.

Squad Three
Squad Three was originally led by Rōjūrō "Rose" Otoribashi until he was forced to forfeit his post after Sōsuke Aizen placed him through Hollowification. Gin Ichimaru, formerly Aizen's lieutenant in Squad Five, takes Rose's position after Aizen revealed his true colors. After, Izuru briefly takes over the captain duties for a while, the anime depicting Shūsuke Amagai to momentarily hold the captain status before his death, Rose is allowed to resume his duties after Aizen was defeated.

Chikane Iba
 is the former lieutenant of Squad 3 under Rōjūrō Otoribashi, appearing in the Turn Back the Pendulum gaiden. She is the mother of Tetsuzaemon Iba, the current lieutenant of the 7th Division. She retired from her position sometime later.

Gin Ichimaru

Izuru Kira
 is the lieutenant of Squad Three, formerly in Squads 5 and 4. He is a friend of Momo Hinamori and Renji Abarai from their days in the Soul Reaper academy, and the three often spend their free time together. Though Kira is loyal to his friends, he often places his duties as a lieutenant above them. He defends his captain, Gin Ichimaru, from a grief-stricken Hinamori, and later calls himself a "monster" for raising his sword against her. He subsequently comes to regret helping Gin Ichimaru to defect from Soul Society, and develops more of a depressed and pessimistic demeanor. During the Wandenreich invasion, Kira is mortally wounded by Sternritter Bazz-B. However, he is revealed to have survived the attack and is later healed by Mayuri Kurotsuchi, allowing him to battle the multiple weakened bird cloned copies of Lille Barro's Vollständig.

When released, Wabisuke straightens and its blade forms three sides of squares, becoming angular hook. It has the ability to double the weight of whatever it strikes. The effect is cumulative, so each following hit exponentially increases the weight of the target. Thus, after seven or eight blocked attacks, his opponents are unable to lift their own swords or even move their body, leaving them on the ground with their head bowed as though asking forgiveness. At this point Wabisuke's released form, a blade bent into a squared hook, comes into play, being used to decapitate the kneeling opponent, denying them forgiveness.

He is voiced by Takahiro Sakurai in the Japanese version of the anime and by Grant George in the English dub.

Shūsuke Amagai
 is an anime-exclusive character introduced as the captain of Squad 3 during season nine of the anime. He has an unkempt appearance and is usually bright, lively, and unpretentious, and can become drunk on a single drink of alcohol. Because Amagai spent most of his Soul Reaper career away from Soul Society as part of a patrol group, the members of the 3rd Division are mistrustful of him when first meeting him. As such, he spends the episodes following his introduction trying to prove himself to them and the rest of the Soul Reapers by promoting teamwork between all the divisions. As the anime progresses Amagai is quickly revealed to have ulterior motives, with his friendly attitude only being a means to further his plans. He joined the Gotei 13 in order to exact revenge upon Genryūsai Shigekuni Yamamoto for killing his father to keep the bakkōtō a secret. After his various accomplices are slain in Soul Society, Amagai takes the nuclei of their bakkōtō and engages Yamamoto in battle. He ends up fighting Ichigo Kurosaki while Rukia and the others Rurichiyo Kasumioji (who Amagai abducted after killing Gyokaku Kumoi) and is defeated by Ichigo. Upon learning the truth about his father's death, he takes his own life to atone for his misdeeds.

When released, it takes the form of a white hook sword with curved pipes that form the hilt. He can focus fireballs into the crux of the hook and, by slamming it into the ground, create large fissures of flame to attack enemies with. Raika's bankai, enlarges the blade and creates a giant conch-shaped guard worn across Amagai's arm, with the handle of the blade hidden inside it. This form gives him greater control of his fire attacks, his most powerful technique creating giant dragons of fire to encircle and crush his foe. His Bakkōtō, a twin-bladed tuning fork-shaped weapon, creates black-plated armor across Amagai's right arm and a green energy sword emitting from the weapon when activated.

His Bakkōtō (獏爻刀, roughly "tapir crossing blade") negates any other active Soul Reaper zanpakutō abilities, forcing opponents to rely on other powers.

He is voiced by Ken'yū Horiuchi in the Japanese version of the anime and by Rick Zieff in the English dub.

Makoto Kibune 
 is an anime character who is added to Squad 3 as the 3rd Seat during season nine of the anime. He has brown hair and purple-rimmed glasses. While he outwardly appears friendly towards his subordinates, he is highly intolerant towards failure, calling those who fall in battle "trash". When in training at the Soul Reaper academy, Kibune stood out as a highly gifted student, but his inability to function in a team prevented him from attaining rank in the Gotei 13 where a teammate getting injured upon his attack on a hollow got him in trouble with Central 46. This led Kibune to join the patrol squads under Shūsuke Amagai instead. Around this time, he became a servant of Gyōkaku Kumoi and gained a bakkōtō. Though it gives him the necessary power to wreak havoc on Soul Society, he eventually loses control of the Bakkōtō and is killed by Izuru Kira as Makoto's body laid on the ground in flames.

When released by the command , it takes the form of a large, two-bladed weapon. When combined with his Bakkōtō, Makoto can telekinetically control the sword, allowing him to attack enemies from any direction and spin the blade like a saw blade.

He is voiced by Hikaru Midorikawa in the Japanese version of the anime and by Christopher Corey Smith in the English dub.

Squad Four

Retsu Unohana
 was the captain of Squad 4, one of the founding members of the Gotei 13 and the first Kenpachi, a title granted to the captains of the Squad 11. Before becoming a captain, Unohana was regarded as the most diabolical criminal to ever grace Soul Society, being infamous for her sadistic bloodlust for battle. She invented the "Art of Killing" and gave herself the name  in part of her boast that she had mastered all kind of fighting arts. Unohana was desperate to find opponents who give her satisfying challenges until she battled Kenpachi Zaraki, whom she regarded as stronger than her after being able to give her a scar on the chest. However, for unknown reasons, after becoming the captain of Squad 4, Unohana became a serene and soft-spoken lady who never displayed distress even in the most perilous situations and when situations prove demanding, she usually responded with sharp-minded thinking. She used honorifics when addressing everyone, including her subordinates. As the captain of Squad 4, Unohana excelled in healing techniques, being taught to her by Royal Guard member, Tenjiro Kirinji, which she put to use in treating the most severe injuries and performing major surgeries, normally on the captains and if necessary, lieutenants. Though she is always polite to her patients and subordinates, aspects of her true persona manifested a bit with her mere presence intimidating her charges into submission if they try to leave her care before they are fully healed or, in the English dub, if they complain about the way they are being treated. She was very good in noticing details, as shown by her being the first to notice a slight abnormality on Aizen's fake corpse, which was confirmed later on by Aizen himself. During the Battle of Karakura Town, she was one of the captains sent to assist Ichigo in Hueco Mundo and later accompanied Ichigo to the town through Garganta, although she did not take part in the battle directly. Later, during the Wandenreich invasion, Unohana and all other members of her division were ordered to remain in their barracks by Yamamoto and after Shunsui Kyōraku became the new Captain-Commander, she resumed her true persona when asked to train Zaraki in what would become a battle to the death. After repeatedly taking Zaraki to the brink of death and bringing him back to continue fighting, Unohana released her Bankai to complete Zaraki's "awakening". In the end, she was run through by Zaraki, dying, but grateful that she had served her purpose and helped Zaraki to learn the name of his zanpakutō.

When in its sealed form it resembles a curved tachi. In its shikai, the entire sword transforms into a gigantic, flying, one-eyed creature resembling a manta ray. It has the ability to heal people by swallowing them and recuperates them in its stomach. When Unohana reseals Minazuki, it dissolves into green mist and reforms into the sheath of her zanpakutō. When activated it releases a red, oily substance from the blade. Its powers have yet to be revealed.

She is voiced by Aya Hisakawa in the Japanese version of the anime and by Kate Higgins in the English dub.

Retsu Unohana is inspired by the mysterious lover of Okita Souji, the first captain of Squad one of Shinsengumi. She was acknowledged to be a strong fighter and a daughter of a Western doctor.

Seinosuke Yamada
 is the former lieutenant of the Squad 4, the older brother of Hanatarō Yamada. He served the division 100 years ago, during the Turn Back the Pendulum gaiden. While much of him is unknown, Seinosuke is described as having a bad character, although he respects his captain, Retsu Unohana very much. He later left his position.

Isane Kotetsu
 is the lieutenant and, after Unohana's death, captain of Squad 4. She is the older sister of Kiyone Kotetsu. Unlike Kiyone, Isane is generally quiet and observant and taller than average, though she shares her sister's sense of loyalty to her captain. Unohana notes that Isane suffers from frequent and recurring nightmares. This is sometimes used as material for jokes as Isane's nightmares are often odd or whimsical in their contents. For example, she once had a nightmare that ended with her screaming "fish paste." She is very emotional by nature, crying after the Wandereich's first invasion of the Soul Society and again when she finds Captain Unohana's farewell note before the latter's fight to the death with Zaraki.

During the Soul Society Arc, she was present at Rukia's execution. When Ichigo appeared, Isane, alongside Chōjirō Sasakibe and Marechiyo Ōmaeda, attacked him but were swiftly defeated. She was present when Aizen revealed his true nature to Hitsugaya and Unohana, and quickly broadcast the information to the rest of Soul Society.
Isane was part of the reinforcements sent to Hueco Mundo in order to assist Ichigo and his friends. She and Unohana healed Chad and Gantenbainne Mosqueda after saving them from the Exequias. After Unohana headed to Fake Karakura Town, she ordered Isane to assist Captain Byakuya Kuchiki and Captain Kenpachi Zaraki in battle against Espada Yammy Llargo.  During the Wandenreich invasion of Soul Society, Isane and the rest of the 4th Division were ordered by Yamamoto to remain in their barracks.

When released, two smaller blades protrude from Itegumo's hilt at 45° angles. Its special abilities, if any, remain unknown.

She is voiced by Yukana in the Japanese version of the anime and by Stephanie Sheh in the English dub.
Despite setting up shop, Urahara's skills haven't dulled since he was able to fend off Wonderweiss, Yammy, and even trap Aizen for a few minutes.

Yasochika Iemura
 is the 3rd Seat Officer of the Squad 4 and the leader of its first relief team serving under Retsu Unohana. Despite his high rank, he addresses his 3rd seat peers in the other divisions with a -sama honorific suffix as he comes from the weakest division in terms of combat. Iemura meticulously keeps a diary, which he sometimes defeats the purpose of by narrating what he is writing in it, particularly when lamenting something. He is quite proficient in the use of healing Kidō and his speedy treatments are known to rival those of his Division's lieutenant, Isane Kotetsu.

The name and abilities of Iemura's zanpakutō are unknown. Iemura was only seen using his sword once in the manga against a 4th Division member after the latter annoyed him. It resembles a regular katana with a square shaped guard.

He is voiced by Yutaka Aoyama in the Japanese version of the anime and by Cam Clarke in the English dub.

Hanatarō Yamada
 is the 7th Seat Officer of Squad 4 and the leader of its 14th Relief Squad. Hanatarō is very timid and nervous, mostly he is not thinking about what he is doing. He tends to be clumsy and easily duped. Despite his character, he is shown to be very talented in healing and treating including even displaying boldness at times as he risks his position as a Soul Reaper to help Rukia Kuchiki escape execution while healing Ichigo on several occasions. Instead of his zanpakutō, Hanatarō usually carries the 4th Division medical pack on his back that he uses to heal others in the battlefield. Because he has strong relationships with Ichigo, Rukia and Renji, he is part of the reinforcement sent by Gotei 13 to infiltrate Hueco Mundo in order to assist his fellow Soul Reapers in battle, presumably healing them once the battle is over. In Hueco Mundo, Hanatarō was assigned to Captain Byakuya Kuchiki instead of his own captain, Unohana. While there, he was briefly injured by Rukia who at that time was under Zommari Leroux's control but made full recovery and immediately resumed his duty. He is also known as the "Lil' Creepy Medical Kid".

Though he does possess a zanpakutō, named , he tends to misplace it as he rarely needs to use it. When it strikes an opponent, Hisagomaru heals their wounds rather than causing them damage. A red gauge on the blade then fills depending on the severity of the healed wounds. In this state, Hisagomaru unleashes a reiatsu-based attack (similar to kido or cero) equal to the severity and number of wounds that have been healed. The proportion of its strength, if enough energy is stored, is nearly strong enough to decapitate a Menos. However, upon releasing the energies, Akiero Hisagomaru retains its scalpel form, rendering it effectively useless in hand-to-hand combat. He can also release the current amount of energy before it is filled, although this is only mentioned and not actually seen. It is also the only known Zanpakutō that has different names in sealed form and shikai.

Hanatarō was one of the selected higher officers who has been ordered to transfer a partial amount of their own reiatsu to restore Ichigo's Soul Reaper power, although the order is only applicable to captains and lieutenants. It is best concluded that Hanatarō is on the par at the lieutenant's level.

He is voiced by Kōki Miyata in the Japanese version of the anime and by Spike Spencer in the English dub.

Squad Five
Squad Five was originally led by Shinji Hirako until he was forced to forfeit his post to his lieutenant Sōsuke Aizen after the latter placed him through Hollowification. It was after Aizen revealed his true colors, with Momo briefly taking over captain duties for a while, that Shinji is allowed to resume his duties as captain after Aizen was defeated.

Momo Hinamori
 is the lieutenant of Squad 5. She is an upbeat and easy-going girl who is generally quite trusting, if not naive. She is a childhood friend of Tōshirō Hitsugaya, who called her "bed-wetter Momo" in retaliation whenever she called him "Shiro-chan" ("Lil' Shiro" in the English dub). She befriended Izuru Kira and Renji Abarai when she joined the Soul Reaper academy, and the three later joined the 5th Division under Sōsuke Aizen. Being the only one of them to have stayed with the division, Hinamori greatly admired Aizen; it is because of her deep admiration and respect for him that she is in deep shock and denial after he tries to kill her and subsequently betrays the Soul Society, even suggesting in one of her mentally unstable moments that Gin Ichimaru is controlling him somehow. She later joins the rest of Soul Society in fighting against Aizen during this battle, and calls Aizen a captain, but Matsumoto knows it was only out of habit. During this battle, Aizen again has Momo seriously injured by using his powers and fooling Momo's long time friend Captain Hitsugaya into stabbing her in the chest. It is later revealed that she survives this and is undergoing organ regeneration under the supervision of Mayuri Kurotsuchi. The final arc shows Momo being recovered and that she has been on good terms with Shinji Hirako as he became her new captain.

When released, Tobiume's blade straightens and produces several jitte-like prongs along its length. In this form, Tobiume acts as a focus for Hinamori's spiritual power, concentrating it into energy bursts capable of cratering floors and breaching walls. She can also compress her power into massive energy balls and toss them from the blade's tip. To complement her kidō-based zanpakutō, Hinamori is noted to be talented with kidō spells as well, able to combine kidō abilities with her own zanpakutō to easily deal with three arrancars at once.

Momo is voiced by Kumi Sakuma in the Japanese version of the anime and by Karen Strassman in the English dub.

Squad Six
Ginrei Kuchiki
Ginrei Kuchiki is the grandfather of Byakuya Kuckiki and the father-in-law of Koga Kuchiki. He was the captain of Squad 6.

Ginrei is voiced by Kinryū Arimoto in the Japanese version of the anime and by JB Blanc in the English dub.

Sōjun Kuchiki
 was the former lieutenant of the Squad 6 under Ginrei Kuchiki, appearing in the Turn Back the Pendulum gaiden. He is Ginrei Kuchiki's son and Byakuya Kuchiki's father. Sōjun had severe health issues, although he still wanted to succeed his father as the Head of Kuchiki family. However, he was later killed in action and was buried next to his wife.

Byakuya Kuchiki

Ginjirō Shirogane

Renji Abarai

Kōga Kuchiki

Koga Kuchiki was the Lieutenant of Squad 6 and his Zanpakuto was named Muramasa.

He is voiced by Isshin Chiba in the Japanese version of the anime and by David Vincent in the English dub.

Squad Seven
Squad Seven was originally led by Love Aikawa until he was forced to forfeit his post after Sōsuke Aizen placed him through Hollowification. By the events of the story, Sajin Komamura took over Love's position as captain.

Jin'emon Kotsubaki
 is the former lieutenant of Squad Seven under Love Aikawa, appearing in the Turn Back the Pendulum gaiden. He is also the father of Sentarō Kotsubaki. Jin'emon later left his service for unknown reasons.

Sajin Komamura
 is the captain of the Squad Seven, a member of the Werewolf Clan that was once banished to the Animal Realm and transformed to anthropomorphic wolves for committing various crimes. However, they managed to survive and eventually climbed back to the Soul Society despite retaining their half-beast forms. Originally, Komamura is very self-conscious about his appearance and wore a large helmet that conceals his entire head before it was destroyed during his fight with Kenpachi Zaraki. From there on, Komamura gained enough confidence to show his face. His canine appearance is often the source of jokes; for example, when his lieutenant asks where to find a bathroom, he appears to direct him to a fire hydrant, though he is in fact pointing at a bathroom just around the corner. Komamura has a close friendship with Kaname Tōsen and is shocked when the latter defects from Soul Society, feeling that his friend has abandoned his morals. Komamura resolves to awaken Tōsen with his own hands. However, after seeing his former friend's motives and ideology, realizes he has no choice but to fight him. Komamura is immensely strong as demonstrated by his ability to hurl the arrancar Poww's massive released state over his head and onto the ground. Komamura engages Tōsen in battle until his former friend is defeated by Shūhei Hisagi and dies. Later, during the Wandenreich invasion of the Soul Society, Komamura battles the Stern Ritter Bambietta Basterbine by releasing his bankai, but she steals his bankai from him. During the short break after the first invasion, he visited his gigantic werewolf grandfather to train, saying that he no longer feels ashamed of his ancestry. When the Wandenreich begins their second invasion, Komamura confronts Bambietta again, this time being able to retrieve his bankai while revealing to have used the Humanization Technique his grandfather taught him to assume human form while fully invincible at the cost of his heart. Once he beats Bambietta to an inch of her life, the effects of the Humanization Technique wear off and Komamura regress back to his usual form as Iba carries his captain's body away while telling him that they will avenge Yamamoto. Ten years after the Wandenreich's invasion, it is shown that Iba has replaced Komamura's position as captain; Komamura's whereabouts itself is not revealed.

Once released with the command , Tenken creates various body parts of a giant to copy whatever body part Komamura moves; for example, should Komamura swing his sword, a gigantic disembodied arm wielding a sword appears and does the same thing. Tenken's bankai,  brings forth the entire giant, which also copies Komamura's movements. Though extremely destructive, Komamura's bankai has a major weakness; any damage inflicted on the giant is reflected upon Komamura, and any damage done to the giant's sword is reflected upon his zanpakutō, as shown when Aizen breaks Komamura's sword and severs his left arm. This weakness essentially makes it a bigger target to a strong enough opponent. According to Tosen, Komamura's Bankai is supposed to finish off the opponent in one hit, which could mean its weakness is to balance out its immense strength. While the weakness may seem overwhelming at first glance, Komamura and his bankai sharing one another's pain is also an advantage; because of the connection the two share, Komamura's bankai will heal at a rate proportional to how much Komamura heals, making it the only bankai in the Soul Society capable of being restored without needing to be modified or reforged. After attaining his Human Transformation technique, Komamura's bankai gains a new ability, . In this form, the giant sheds its armor and becomes more agile and demonic in appearance. Due to the nature of Komamura's Human Transformation Technique, the giant and Komamura become virtually immune to physical damage.

Komamura is voiced by Tetsu Inada in the Japanese version of the anime. In the English dub, he is voiced by Kim Strauss during the Soul Society Arc and by JB Blanc from episode 99 onward.

Tetsuzaemon Iba
 is the lieutenant and, ten years after the Wandenreich's invasion, captain of the Squad Seven. Iba had transferred from Squad 11 once realizing he would never be promoted to lieutenant if he had stayed, a goal which Ikkaku Madarame implies is to follow in the footsteps of his mother, Chikane Iba. His former compatriots look down upon him because of this, though Iba still enjoys a good fight and usually spends his free time with Squad 11 members. He and Ikkaku Madarame have a custom of dueling with each other, drinking sake, then dueling again to see who has to get more. Iba has a distinctive hair cut and wears black sunglasses with his standard Soul Reaper uniform. Iba is well-rounded in both swordsmanship and kidō, only because it made becoming a lieutenant easier.

The name of Iba's zanpakutō is unknown as well as its abilities. In its released state, Iba's zanpakutō extends into a falchion or a large bladed scimitar with a pick-like protrusion a short distance below the tip of the sword.

He is voiced by Rintarou Nishi in the Japanese version of the anime and by Neil Kaplan in the English dub.

Jirōbō Ikkanzaka
 is the former 4th seat of Squad 7. He is the younger brother of Jidanbō Ikkanzaka, the gatekeeper who guards the entry to Seireitei. He appeared only once to fight Uryū Ishida and Orihime Inoue when they were in Sereitei trying to rescue Rukia. He tries to kill Inoue, but is quickly defeated by Uryū, who pierces Jirōbō's Chain of Fate and Soul Sleep with his arrows, resulting in the permanent loss of Jirōbō's Soul Reaper powers.

The shikai command is "flap away" (羽搏きなさい, habatakinasai; "Spread Your Wings" in the English dub). It consists of countless flying curved blades, which he can control using telekinesis. Although the blades move faster than the eye can see, they can be easily destroyed or dodged using Flash Step or other fast-moving techniques.

He is voiced by Kazuhiro Nakata in the Japanese version of the anime and by Peter Lurie in the English dub.

Squad Eight
Squad Eight was originally led by Shunsui Kyōraku until he is promoted to Head Captain and transferred to Squad One with his lieutenant Nanao Ise. During his time as Squad Eight captain, Shunsui originally had Lisa Yadōmaru as his lieutenant before her Hollowification resulted in her leaving her post. Sometime after the Wandenreich's invasion, Lisa returns to Soul Society and fills the vacant seat of the captain of Squad Eight.

Tatsufusa Enjōji
 is the 3rd seat of Squad 8. When Ichigo and friends invaded the Soul Society to rescue Rukia, Tatsufusa tried to prevent Yasutora "Chad" Sado from reaching her only to be defeated by Yasutora.

He is voiced by Toshiharu Sakurai in the Japanese version of the anime and by Kim Strauss in the English dub.

Squad Nine
Squad Nine was originally led by Kensei Muguruma until he and his lieutenant Mashiro Kuna were forced to forfeit their posts after Sōsuke Aizen placed them through Hollowification. Kaname Tōsen, Aizen's accomplice, takes Kensei's position until Aizen revealed his true colors. After Shūhei briefly takes over captain duties for a while, he becomes a co-lieutenant when Kensei and Mashiro resume their duties after Aizen was defeated.

Kaname Tōsen
 was the captain of Squad 9 at the start of the series, formerly its 5th Seat officer during the Turn Back the Pendulum gaiden. He had been blind since birth, but was capable of using his spiritual sense to "see". Tōsen was an extremely calm and serious pacifist, though he will not restrain from fighting for what he believes in or to preserve justice. Tōsen adopted his ideals from a peaceful friend he had before becoming a Soul Reaper, becoming disillusioned after she was murdered for nagging by her husband Tokinada Tsunayashiro and decided to "take the path with the least bloodshed". He felt it necessary to join Sōsuke Aizen in defecting from the Soul Reapers at the conclusion of the Soul Society arc. Later revealed to have undergone hollowification prior to his battle against Komamura in the Fake Karakura Town, Tōsen reveals he betrayed the Soul Reapers as he saw injustice in the Soul Society's refusal to administer capital punishment to Tsunayashiro. From there, Tōsen completely transforms into a hollow and, too consumed in his ecstasy of seeing for the first time in his life, is struck down by Hisagi. Tōsen reverts to his human form while barely clinging to life as he gains closure with Komamura while requesting to see Hisagi's face one last time, only for his body to explode as the result of Aizen allowing his Soul Suicide to occur.

Tōsen's zanpakutō is called . Its abilities are vibrations. In its shikai, Suzumushi releases high-pitched tone that renders unconscious anyone who hears it. Its second form, Benihiko, sword creates trail of hundreds of blades, which rain down on his opponent. Bankai state, Suzumushi Tsuishiki Enma Korogi, allows Tōsen to create a sensory deprivation dome around himself and his opponent. After being modified by Aizen, Tōsen gains the powers of a Vizard and uses his Resurrección Suzumushi Hyakushiki Grillar Grillo to become an insect-like hollow and regain his sight. This makes Suzumushi a Zanpakutō with the highest known amount of release forms.

Tōsen is voiced by Toshiyuki Morikawa in the Japanese version. In the English dub, he is voiced by David Rasner until episode 278 and by Brian Palermo in later episodes.

Shūhei Hisagi
 is the co-lieutenant of the Squad 9, sharing the position with Mashiro Kuna. As a child he was saved by the then 9th Division captain, Kensei Muguruma. In later years Shūhei has a "69" tattoo on the left side of his face, matching the one Kensei has on his stomach. There also may be a connection with his zanpakutō and Kensei's zanpakutō, as they both use Kaze, or wind. While acting as an instructor at the Soul Reaper academy, Shūhei's class was attacked by a hollow and in fighting it he received a distinctive scar across his face. Shūhei is an extremely mature and calm individual, allowing him to get along well with his captain, Kaname Tōsen. After Tōsen defects from Soul Society, Shūhei assumes the duties of his captain as an acting replacement. Though he swore to help Komamura "open the eyes" of his former captain, in the end he is forced to attack Tōsen to keep him from killing Komamura. According to series creator Tite Kubo, Hisagi became fairly popular with fans long before his backstory and personality were really explored, an abnormality among Bleach characters. Hisagi becomes the lead protagonist of the light novel side story Can't Fear Your Own World which takes place after Wandenreich's defeat, learning more of the truth behind Tōsen's betrayal being caused by the story's antagonist Tokinada Tsunayashiro.

When released with the command , it takes the form of two kusarigama-like weapons, with two blades curving both directions, connected by a long chain. Through Kensei's help during their battle with the Wandenreich's invasion, Shuhei acquired his bankai  which he eventually uses during his battle with Tsunayashiro in the light novel. The bankai becomes an orb of black chains that wrap around both the necks of Hisagi and his opponent, continuously draining spiritual energy from them to prevent one opponent from killing the other.

Shūhei is voiced by Katsuyuki Konishi in the Japanese version of the anime and by Steve Staley in the English dub.

Squad Ten
Isshin Kurosaki
Prior to taking his wife's surname, Ichigo's father  was originally captain of Squad 10 two decades ago. It is unknown what his relationships are with the other members of the "Shiba", most notably with Kaien Shiba, who bears a strong resemblance to Ichigo. Most of his actions as a Soul Reaper remain unknown, except for the events at Naruki City, where he met the Quincy Masaki Kurosaki while fighting Aizen's hollow White. When Masaki is bitten by White, she undergoes hollowfication before Isshin stopped it by renouncing his Soul Reaper powers and linking his soul to hers to halt the process. Having lost Masaki to the elusive Hollow Grand Fisher, Isshin regained his Soul Reaper powers yet concealed it from his family for some time as he killed off the Arrancar that Grand Fisher became while regretting that he did not have his power prior to save Masaki. Isshin eventually reveals himself as a Soul Reaper to Ichigo while aiding him in his fight with Aizen, appearing just as the villain was about to reveal his son's lineage as the offspring of a Soul Reaper and a Quincy. Seventeen months later, after Ichigo regains his Soul Reaper powers and the Wandenreich complete their first invasion of the Soul Society, Isshin appears to Ichigo in his Soul Reaper attire and explains Ichigo's past to him.

Having unbelievable spiritual pressure, despite being knocked by Ichigo at times, Isshin is tremendously powerful. Spitting blood onto the blade creates a huge wave of fire. His Bankai is yet to be shown in the current storyline, but is noted by Aizen to put a considerable strain on his body, thus being unusable if Isshin is heavily injured.

He is voiced by Toshiyuki Morikawa in the Japanese version of the anime and by Patrick Seitz in the English dub.

Tōshirō Hitsugaya

The current captain of Squad 10 and the series breakout character. When using his bankai, wings, a protector on his right arm, and a time meter made of ice appear on Tōshirō. During this form he can perform more powerful moves using ice.

The origin of Toshiro Hitsugaya is the vice-commander of Shinegami, Hijikata Toshizo. He was known as the "demonic vice commander", which is why Hitsugaya is really strict. Also, Hijikata was well known for his problems with women, which is a great inspiration that leads to Toshiro's problems with his lieutenant, Matsumoto Rangiku

Rangiku Matsumoto
 is the lieutenant of Squad 10 who is a childhood friend of Gin Ichimaru. She often uses her beauty and large bust to avoid work to go shopping or drinking with her fellow lieutenants. But she is very serious and thoughtful as a lieutenant, offering advice while skilled enough to overwhelm another strong lieutenant or hold her own against arrancars. The light novels reveal Rangiku to possess a fragment of the Soul King's scattered essence within her, which resulted in her near death experience when Aizen extracted a bit of her soul for his schemes and spurred Gin's own agenda to avenge Rangiku. By the time Rangiku learned Gin's true reasons of betraying the Soul Society, she mourned over him as Nanao noted.

She persuaded Tōshirō Hitsugaya, while he was still residing in Rukongai, to join the Gotei 13 to gain control over his spiritual pressure. The two of them have grown close ever since. Although Hitsugaya always bickers about her drinking habit and laziness, she has an unwavering loyalty and devotion to him and frequently tries to get him to lighten up, despite his serious attitude. Before Hitsugaya, Rangiku also had a close relationship with her former captain, Isshin Shiba, who is just as lazy as herself. She often foisted her responsibilities onto Isshin, who would then retaliate in kind.

Its guard is in the shape of a cat's head. When released with the command , the blade dissolves into ash. In combat, Matsumoto can control the movement of the ash, and cut anything it lands on by moving the hilt. The ash is also solid enough to be used as a shield to block enemy attacks. Due to her laziness, she has difficulty achieving bankai. Series creator, Tite Kubo identifies Rangiku as one of his two favorite female characters in the series, citing that he "has a lot of fun drawing her and creating stories with her."

She is voiced by Kaya Matsutani in the Japanese version of the anime and by Megan Hollingshead in the English dub .

Squad Eleven
Founded by its original leader Retsu Unohana, Squad Eleven is a direct-combat Division with a specialization in swords-only combat, making them the most specialized division as they forgo other Soul Reaper practices. What separates the division is its members' ideals is that fighting is what makes life worth living and prefer death in battle. The squad captain of Squad Eleven takes on the title "Kenpachi", with its current leader being the eleventh Kenpachi: Kenpachi Zaraki.

Kenpachi Kiganjō
 was the captain of Squad 11 Division immediately preceding Kenpachi Zaraki, primarily known as the 10th Kenpachi. He appeared in the Turn Back the Pendulum gaiden, set 100 years before the main story. Kiganjō was bloodthirsty like all other captains of the division, though he was shown to be extremely lazy, as he often failed to attend the captains' meeting, as stated by Shinji Hirako. His position was eventually relinquished, along with his life, during Zaraki's captaincy test, which required him killing Kiganjō while watched by 200 members of the 11th Division.

Kenpachi Zaraki

, is an ex-enemy and bloodthirsty rival of Ichigo. He is a Soul Reaper of Squad 11 in the Gotei 13, though still self-centered and violent, his actions tend to be for the best and his relationship with his division and others is always portrayed comically. This comical shift is primarily centered around his appearances in the Bleach anime and omake stories, with the exception of the occasional diatribe between himself and Yachiru. He is depicted as having a very poor sense of direction, and is often depicted in omake stories asking his lieutenant Yachiru for directions to a particular place (who then randomly points in a direction even though she herself has a terrible sense of direction).

Zaraki is voiced by Fumihiko Tachiki in the Japanese version of the anime. In the English dub, he is voiced by David Lodge in earlier seasons and by Patrick Seitz in later seasons.

Kenpachi Zaraki is inspired by Shinpachi Nagakura, the captain of the second squad of Shinsengumi. In the real world, Shinpachi was a proud and arrogant fighter, due to his being the only swordsman who was born in a samurai-origin family. This is the reason why Kenpachi Zaraki in Bleach is really supercilious and relies only on his natural power.

Yachiru Kusajishi
 is the lieutenant of Squad 11. She is most recognizable by her mid-length, bright pink hair. She is childlike in most aspects, as she is small, cute, cheerful, and carefree most of the time. She was found as an infant by Kenpachi Zaraki in the 79th District of Rukongai's North Alley, "Kusajishi", the second-most violent area of Rukongai compared to the 80th District "Zaraki". Despite being drenched in blood and having just killed a large group of men, Kenpachi did not frighten her as she touched his blood-soaked zanpakuto unfazed. Kenpachi named her "Yachiru", in memory of the one person he ever admired, the current captain of the 4th Division, Retsu "Yachiru" Unohana. Since that day, Yachiru has spent much of her time clinging to his back for transport. Like Zaraki, she has no sense of direction, even though he relies on her to find his way; when Kenpachi asks her for directions, her usual response is to simply point in a random direction. Yachiru resents being criticized in any way and will often attack the perpetrator in comical fashion. Further reflecting her childlike nature, Yachiru likes to give people nicknames; for example, she calls her captain Ken-chan ("Kenny" in the English version) and calls Byakuya Bya-kun. Various Bleach omakes show that Yachiru has an absolute love for candy, which is often exploited by other characters to bribe her into leaving them alone. Despite her childlike appearance, Yachiru is apparently quite strong, being capable of lifting Kenpachi and leaping between buildings while carrying him. She is also very fast for her size. She can emit a large amount of spiritual power when angry, which forms into a large, pink, angry cat face. She also has a very high spiritual pressure.

Yachiru's zanpakutō is named .  In its sealed state Sanpo Kenjū takes the form of a wakizashi with a pink hilt which she drags around on a string. Two wheels attached to the bottom of the sheath for her by Ikkaku Madarame facilitate this. According to Yachiru, the ability of her zanpakuto creates two invisible copycats which respectively attack right before and right after Yachiru's own attacks, effectively causing Yachiru's attacks to hit three times and making them more difficult to dodge. Whenever Yachiru wants to, she can make the copycats (who she calls "kids") become visible to others, revealing their monstrous and intimidating appearance.

It is later revealed that Yachiru is actually a manifestation of Kenpachi's zanpakuto, Nozarashi. During the battle against the Wandenreich, Yachiru tells Kenpachi to release her true power, after which she vanishes to form Kenpachi's bankai state. Her position as lieutenant is then filled by Ikkaku.

She is voiced by Hisayo Mochizuki in the Japanese version of the anime and by Dina Sherman in the English dub.

Ikkaku Madarame
 is the 3rd Seat and, ten years after the Wandenreich's invasion, lieutenant of the Squad 11. He is a battle-loving man with a bald head. He fought and was defeated by Kenpachi Zaraki sometime in the past, though was strong enough to survive the battle. Once Zaraki became captain of the 11th Division, Ikkaku and his friend Yumichika Ayasegawa joined the Soul Reapers so that they could fight and die under Zaraki's command. He shares a number of similarities with his captain such as seeking enjoyment in battles by risking his life. He is reportedly the second strongest man in the division. Though strong enough to take a position as a captain, Ikkaku insists his one mission in life is to die under the command of Zaraki.

Though ordinary in appearance, he stores a blood-clotting styptic ointment in its hilt. When released by the command , it transforms into a yari with a wax wood shaft. While he usually treats it as such, he can also turn its shaft into a three section staff to surprise the opponent by using the command . Ikkaku has achieved bankai, though he keeps this a secret from most characters so that he is not pressured to become a captain. Hōzukimaru's bankai, named , takes the form of three oversized weapons connected by a thick chain: two blades in each of his hands and a fan-shaped blade, adorned with a carving of a Chinese dragon, which floats behind him. Aside from the increase in power, his bankai offers no special abilities, and is noted to be unusual for a bankai in this aspect. However, the blades appear to have a generally weak integrity for a bankai, as shown when combating the thirteenth arrancar, Edorad Leones, and later when fighting his released zanpakutō while it was in bankai, using nothing but his own katana and spiritual pressure to shatter the bankai's blades. As a fight progresses, the dragon crest will slowly begin to glow crimson, greatly increasing its power as it does so. He claims that it is lazy and only fully awakens when the dragon crest is fully crimson.

Ikkaku is voiced by Nobuyuki Hiyama in the Japanese version. In the English dub, he is voiced by Vic Mignogna in the original English dub (except in episodes 104 and 105 where he is voiced by Michael Sinterniklaas) and by Todd Haberkorn in Bleach: Thousand-Year Blood War.

Yumichika Ayasegawa
 is the 5th Seat of Squad 11 and Ikkaku's lifelong friend, valuing his opinion very highly and tends to follow him everywhere. The two joined the Soul Reapers so that they could serve under Kenpachi Zaraki.  His position in the squad does not reflect his actual strength; since Ikkaku took the 3rd seat position, Yumichika decided to become the 5th seat because he thinks it's a beautiful number in comparison to 4. He has colorful feathers on his eyelashes and eyebrow as well as shiny skin and hair, giving him a rather womanly appearance. Narcissistic and vain, Yumichika judges everyone and everything by beauty. He goes so far as to try to forget things he deems "ugly" after seeing them and even tries fighting an ugly opponent with his eyes closed.

However, since the 11th Division has an unspoken rule that zanpakutō are only to be used for direct attack, Yumichika keeps this fact secret. According to himself, he would risk dying to conceal his zanpakuto's true power. To conceal it, he releases with the name  with the command , causing the vexed weapon to assume a form consisting of a sickle-shaped blade which can split into four identical blades. During the fight with arrancar Charlotte Cuhlhourne, Yumichika tells him that his zanpakutō has a favorite and least favorite color and this is why he releases it as Fuji Kujaku (wisteria is the least favorite color). When confident he will be able to keep it a secret, he uses his zanpakutō's real name and command  to assume its true released form with the blades splitting into vines which bind the opponent and siphon their spiritual energy into flowers which can restore Yumichika's health when their petals are eaten. Yumichika claims that a full drain from his zanpakuto can kill an opponent, which is proved when he kills an arrancar.

He is voiced by Jun Fukuyama in the Japanese version of the anime and by Brian Beacock in the English dub.

Makizō Aramaki
 is the 10th seat of Squad 11. Nicknamed Maki-Maki by Yachiru Kusajishi, he is often very timid and cowardly, in contrast to other members of the 11th division. Aramaki makes his first appearance when he, by chance, encounters Orihime Inoue and Uryū Ishida as they travel across Seireitei disguised as Soul Reapers. Despite being drunk, he sees through Orihime and Uryū's lie claiming to be part of the 11th Division. However, during an attack by 12th division captain Mayuri Kurotsuchi which kills several members of the 12th division, Orihime protects Uryū and him with her Shun Shun Rikka abilities. Aramaki is confused by why Orihime is upset with the deaths of the 12th Division Soul Reapers and why she saved him.

As Uryū begins fighting Mayuri, he orders Aramaki to take Orihime to safety, threatening to shoot him if he does not comply. As Aramaki retreats with Orihime, Orihime demands that he let her go so that she can help Uryū, but he refuses. When Orihime bites him, he knocks her unconscious, and shortly thereafter, encounters Yachiru. Yachiru has him take her back to the 11th Division barracks so that she could lead Kenpachi Zaraki to Ichigo. He accompanies them as they look for Ichigo, questioning them on why they would go so far for a friend. The group eventually catch up to Ichigo after his victory over Byakuya Kuchiki. When Ichigo asks who he is, he says that he is nobody important and that Ichigo should just pretend that he is not there.

Aramaki later appears in the Bount arc. Aramaki's nickname is confused with that of Maki Ichinose; Ichinose's nickname was "Maki-chan," while Aramaki's was "Maki-Maki."

He is voiced by Yūichi Nagashima in the Japanese version of the anime and by JB Blanc in the English dub.

Maki Ichinose
, introduced during the anime's Bount arc, was a member of Squad 11 under Kiganjō before he left the group after Kenpachi killed the previous captain. He traveled the human world, but one day, while in a weakened state in a desert, he fell upon a hollow that almost killed him; the hollow was subdued by Jin Kariya, who allowed Maki to kill it. Maki swore his loyalty to Jin after that, only breaking the vow once to fight Zaraki. He helps the Bounts infiltrate the Soul Society, and gets to fight Kenpachi but is killed by Kariya once his purpose is fulfilled.

Maki's zanpakutō is called . Its shikai form is activated by the command  or "flash and burst" in the English Dub. When released, Nijigasumi glows with rainbow colors and has the ability to control light for various purposes. It can make Maki turn invisible or douse the area in light, playing havoc with opponents' counterattacks. It can also use light offensively, creating blades of light to cut or crush opponents. His zanpakutō later helps in Kariya's defeat, acting as a lightning rod for Kariya's attacks.

He is voiced by Susumu Chiba in the Japanese version of the anime and by Sam Riegel in the English dub.

Squad Twelve
Originally led by Kirio Hikifune, Squad Twelve is associated with scientific research with her successor, Kisuke Urahara establishing the SRDI. After Kisuke and his lieutenant Hiyori Sarugaki were forced to leave their posts as the former was accused of the Hollowification of the latter and the other Vizards, Mayuri Kurotsuchi became the current captain of Squad Twelve.

Mayuri Kurotsuchi

Nemu Kurotsuchi
 is the lieutenant of Squad 12, a rather introverted and passive woman who prefers to stay silent in her captain's presence. Unlike her "older sisters", Nemu outlived them. Though Mayuri refers to Nemu as his "daughter", he hides his joy towards Nemu and creates a farce of seeing her as nothing more but a tool to use as decoy. But Nemu did learn the truth from Akon, keeping it to herself while having compassion for others as seen when she saves Uryū Ishida's life in gratitude of the Quincy sparing Mayuri. Often when she does speak it is in a subdued monotone, and at least one comical instance she mixes up the colloquial usage of the word "cheese!" when taking a picture with the word "butter." During Mayuri's fight with Pernida, Nemu acted against Mayuri's orders to save him from the Quincy, revealing to have modified her body strength while increasing her decomposition rate. Despite Mayuri's chastising, Nemu throws him to a safe distance as she proceeds to fight Pernida on her own. She ultimately sacrifices herself to have Perinda suffer an agonizing death from her cellular makeup, though Mayuri saves her brain from being eaten. While Nemuri's lieutenant position is taken over by Akon, who formerly filled the 3rd Seat position, Mayuri creates the younger  as his new assistant.

Nemu's body is a Gigai designed to withstand fatal wounds and is immune to various poisons, containing various toxins and serums Mayuri stored in her that make her highly dangerous to whoever eats her or attack her internally. While her Gigai is also composed of highly regenerative cells that her brain regulates, Nemu can still suffer pain and carries around a variety of antidotes to be used as she sees fit. In addition to having superhuman strength, she is also capable of boring through obstacles by rotating an arm at high speeds with the hand functioning as a drill-bit while using parts of her soul in her more devastating attacks. Nemu does not normally carry a zanpakutō, but she is shown to have one in an illustration in the artbook "All Color but the Black" that takes the form of what appears to be a thin katana.

She is voiced by Rie Kugimiya in the Japanese version of the anime and by Megan Hollingshead in the English dub.

Squad Thirteen
Squad Thirteen is division of the Thirteen Court Squads whose jurisdiction in the land of the living includes Karakura Town, having one member of the squad sent to patrol the area for any Hollow sightings. Among its notable members is Rukia Kuchiki, who succeeds Ukitake as squad captain years after the Soul Society's battle with the Wandenreich.

Jūshirō Ukitake
 was the captain of Squad 13, and the man who devised the Substitute Soul Reaper badges. Since he was three years old, Ukitake suffered from an incurable and fatal lung disease that whitened his hair before his parents brought him to the shrine of an Eastern Rukongai temple dedicated to the hand-like deity Mimihagi. Though Mimihagi saved his life by taking his lungs, using the gained Kamikake ability to keep himself alive, Ukitake still suffers the effects of the illness; his occasional flare ups and coughing up blood act as an inhibition for him throughout the series if he fights for too long, or even becomes too agitated. Despite being forced to leave most of his duties as Squad 13's captain to his subordinates, Ukitake is respected by many Soul Reapers for his honesty, loyalty, and personal sense of justice. He and his friend Shunsui Kyōraku are two of the oldest and most talented captains in the Gotei 13, both having trained under General Yamamoto roughly a thousand years before the current Bleach storyline. During the final arc, when the Soul King is killed, Ukitake saw the only resort is to relinquish his body and life to Mimihagi so that he would take the Soul King's place and save the Soul Society. When Mimihagi was forcibly pulled out by Yhwach, he collapsed ultimately killing him.

In Sōgyo no Kotowari's shikai state, it splits into two thin blades resembling fishing javelins, making it one of only three zanpakutō in the Soul Society to exist as a pair of separate blades, along with Katen Kyōkotsu and the new, reforged version of Zangetsu. His Shikai is revealed to have the ability to absorb reiatsu-based attacks from one blade and then release them back through the other; the tags along the chain connecting the blades allow Ukitake to control the speed and power of the reflected attack. Some Bleach video games set prior to the current story arc incorrectly portray it as having the ability to manipulate water and electricity (which is impossible for Zanpakutō). His bankai is currently unknown.

Jūshirō is voiced by Hideo Ishikawa in the Japanese version and by Liam O'Brien in the English dub (except in episode 40 where he was voiced by Kim Strauss).

Jushiro Ukitake is inspired greatly by Okita Souji, the captain of the first squad of Shinsengumi, and he is the one that is the closest to his original character. In the real life, Okita Souji is a handsome but unhealthy warrior, even though he was believed to be the strongest samurai in the Shinsengumi. This is the reason why Ukitake is always sick but popular with the female characters in the story. Also, because of the kid-adoring personality of Okita Souji, Ukitake appears to be a man who really loves children and never wants to hurt them.

Kaien Shiba
 was the previous lieutenant of Squad 13 where his wife, Miyako Shiba was a part of. He is also the brother of Ganju and Kūkaku Shiba. Kaien's appearance closely resembles Ichigo Kurosaki, a fact noted by Byakuya Kuchiki. During Rukia's entrance as a new member of 13th Division, Kaien and Miyako were the only people who can treat her as a normal Soul Reaper and thus their equal, rather than as a noble of the Kuchiki family. He would become Rukia's mentor who helped her to achieve her shikai, teaching her many advices that would help her in her life. However, Miyako was later killed by the Metastacia and during a mission to slay the hollow, Kaien became possessed as well, after which Rukia was forced to kill him. Metastacia then returned to Hueco Mundo, where it was consumed by Espada Aaroniero Arruruerie, who also absorbed Kaien's soul as well, allowing him to take his form and use his abilities.

His shikai takes the form of a trident and has the ability to create and control water.

He is voiced by Toshihiko Seki in the Japanese version of the anime. In the English dub, he is voiced by Kim Strauss in his first appearance in a flashback scene in episode 49 and by Dave Mallow in later flashbacks.

Miyako Shiba
 was the former 3rd Seat of Squad 13 and lieutenant to her husband Kaien. Like her husband, Miyako treated Rukia Kuchiki during her entrance as a normal Soul Reaper, rather than a noble, and quickly became her personal idol. She was assigned to a mission that eventually led to her death by the hollow Metastacia, who wiped off all of Miyako's squad members while infecting her body.

She is voiced by Sumi Shimamoto in the Japanese version of the anime and by Cindy Robinson in the English dub.

Kiyone Kotetsu
 is the co-3rd Seat of Squad 13 which she shares with Sentarō Kotsubaki who she competes with to impress her Captain. She is the younger sister of Isane Kotetsu, who is the Vice-Captain of the 4th Division. Because of her short hair and young appearance, Kiyone can easily be mistaken for a boy.

She is voiced by Chinami Nishimura in the Japanese version of the anime and by Cindy Robinson in the English dub.

Sentarō Kotsubaki
 is the co-3rd Seat of Squad 13 which he shares with Kiyone Kotetsu who he competes with to impress his Captain.

He is voiced by Kōichi Tōchika in the Japanese version of the anime and by Patrick Seitz in the English dub (except in episode 41 where he was voiced by Michael Lindsay).

Ryūnosuke Yuki
 is a member of Squad 13, replacing Zennosuke Kurumadani in overseeing Karakura Town, during the Wandenreich arc. Ryūnosuke is a timid figure who gets frightened and lacks confidence in his abilities, but has the ability to overcome his fear during critical situations. Ichigo saves Ryūnosuke from Hollows. During the war of the Soul Society, Ryūnosuke learns about the conflict between Soul Reapers and Quincies. His fate is unknown.

He is voiced by Daiki Yamashita in the Japanese version of the anime and by Aleks Le in the English dub.

Squad Zero
Each member has created something for the Soul Society and were acknowledged by the Soul King as significant people who played a part in making history. The light novels would reveal that Squad Zero's true loyalties are to the Soul Society's noble houses and their real purpose is containing the Soul King and maintain the status quo by any means. The division's flower is the Daphne odora-meaning "glory".

Ichibē Hyōsube
 is the commander of the Royal Guards, holding the title . Ichibē is credited for having named everything in Soul Society. Since he coined the term in the first place, he knows each and every names of zanpakutō that all Soul Reapers wield as well as their true names that their wielders themselves may have not even learned yet even if they are accounted with their zanpakutō for a long time.

It is released by the command . In Ichimonji's shikai state, the brush takes the form of a curved blade, while the handle remains the same. Ichimonji has the ability to release ink with every swing it takes. Anything that Ichimonji's ink covers loses its name and powers. Ichibē's bankai is uniquely activated by calling out  instead of "bankai", as Ichimonji was the first Zanpakutō to acquire an evolved form long before the term bankai existed. Upon activation, Ichimonji becomes a long, thick thread that coils in the air around Ichibē. With Shirafude Ichimonji, Ichibē can give and change the name of those who have been struck by the ink of Ichimonji by writing kanji on their body; doing so gives his target the properties and abilities of the name granted. Ichibe's zanpakuto is inspired by Okita Souji's famous katana. In the real world, Okita's sword is called "Kiku-ichimonji" (the single-slash poetic flower (?)), a beautiful but lack realistic usage ability sword.

Ichibē is voiced by Naomi Kusumi in the Japanese version of the anime and by Aaron LaPlante in the English dub.

Tenjirō Kirinji
He is credited for creating hot springs that are able to purge impure blood and reiatsu inside an individual and replace them with fresh new ones. These hot springs serve as the basis for the hot springs created by Kisuke Urahara in his personal training field, which is capable of replenishing reiatsu. Before joining the Royal Guard, Tenjirō was a captain in the Gotei 13 and taught healing techniques to Retsu Unohana. Kinpika takes on the form of a small blade with a curved tip, attached to a long wooden pole. In shikai, Kinpika's blade glows brightly. Its abilities are currently unknown.

Tenjirō is voiced by Tomoyuki Shimura in the Japanese version of the anime and by Mick Lauer in English dub.

Ōetsu Nimaiya
He is credited for inventing the zanpakutō, whose basic form, the  he personally creates for each and every Soul Reaper. The Asauchi, a template of matured zanpakutō wielded by inexperienced Soul Reapers who have yet to communicate with their zanpakutō'', are actually the most powerful of its kind, since they have the potential to become anything.

Ōetsu is voiced by Yōji Ueda in the Japanese version of the anime and by Catero Colbert in English dub.

Senjumaru Shutara
Senjumaru has a number of elongated puppet-like arms that can be manipulated with great dexterity. These arms are powerful enough to hold many things, including zanpakutō. In serving as a Royal Guard, Senjumaru presides over a cadre of assassin-like soldiers who assist her in combat.

Senjumaru is voiced by Rina Satō in the Japanese version of the anime and by Jeannie Tirado in the English dub.

Kirio Hikifune
, holds the title . She also has the ability to infuse her food with reiatsu, but doing so requires her to bulk up substantial fat beforehand, which makes her normally youthful looks almost unrecognizable to other people. Before being promoted to the Royal Guard, Kirio was the captain of Squad 12 and a mother-like figure to her lieutenant, Hiyori Sarugaki. Her promotion is apparently very secretive as no one except the squad captains and people acquainted with her knew the real reason why she left. Kirio was succeeded by Kisuke Urahara of Squad 2, but failed to attend the inauguration ceremony.

Kirio is voiced by Ayumi Tsunematsu in the Japanese version of the anime and by Tara Sands in the English dub.

Reception
Several media from manga, anime and other media have commented on the Soul Reapers from the series. Carlo Santos from Anime News Network has praised the use of the Soul Reapers and Soul Society, since it "takes the familiar tournament formula to the height of creativity" regarding the fact that "This isn't just training and fighting anymore". Melissa Harper has commented that while the name Shinigami is changed to Soul Reaper in the English adaptation, it is an adequate description, and is "therefore a perfectly fine translation." Mania Entertainment commented on Ichigo turning into a Soul Reaper to be "a basic setup for the series itself" and praised how he does not make "awkward moments of handling a sword" making the series less common. Michael Aronson from Mangalife.com has noted the Soul Reapers to be initially similar with the Ghostbusters but he praised how it was later developed as the series progressed. IGN has praised the interactions between  the characters and also commented that Suì-Fēng and Yoruichi share one of the more interesting histories in the series, though feels more could have been done to flesh it out.

References

Soul Reapers
Bleach Soul Reapers